Errol Kojo Bellot, better known professionally as Kojo Funds (born 30 March 1995), is a British singer-songwriter and rapper. His music blends West African and Caribbean sounds with road rap, dancehall and pop.

Kojo Funds featured on Yxng Bane's single "Fine Wine" and on Mabel's "Finders Keepers". His own singles include "Check" with Raye.

Career 
Kojo Funds was born in 1995 in London. He is of mixed Ghanaian and Dominican heritage. He grew up in Custom House in East London and was raised by his mother.

A number of his songs have been produced by GA, including "Dun Talkin". In early 2017, he had a feature on the Yxng Bane single "Fine Wine" which was certified silver by the BPI, and on Mabel's "Finders Keepers" which reached number 8 in the UK Official Charts Company Singles chart. On 9 February 2018 he released the single "Check" with British singer-songwriter Raye.

In 2017 Kojo Funds was nominated for Best Newcomer at the MOBO Awards. In 2018 he played Bestival and Wireless Festival.

He calls his musical style afroswing. It has also been called "afro-bashment". The genre originated in London in late 2000s; it blends West African and Caribbean sounds with road rap, hip hop, dancehall and British pop music.

Personal life
He is an avid supporter of Manchester United F.C.

Discography

Albums

Singles

As lead artist

As featured artist

References

External links

1995 births
Living people
English people of Dominica descent
English people of Ghanaian descent
English male singer-songwriters
English pop singers
English hip hop musicians
People from Canning Town
Rappers from London
Singers from London
21st-century English singers
21st-century British male singers